The European Masters Athletics Championships (formerly European Veterans Athletics Championships) are the biannual championships for masters athletics events held under the auspices of European Masters Athletics (formerly European Veterans Athletics Association) that held its first edition in 1978.

Editions

See also
World Masters Athletics Championships
 Senior sport

References

External links
European Masters Athletics (EMA)
Championships Archive

 
Masters athletics (track and field) competitions
Recurring sporting events established in 1978
Biennial athletics competitions
Athletics competitions in Europe
1978 establishments in Europe